Darren David John Robinson (born 2 March 1973 in Braintree, Essex, England) is an English cricket player who has played for the cricket teams of Essex and Leicestershire.

Some doubts were raised when Robinson first came to Leicestershire but he has proved himself to be a shrewd signing. He's been a consistent force in an otherwise shaky foxes batting line up. In his first two seasons at the club he scored over 1000 runs in the county championship and in his third season which was interrupted by injury he still scored over 700 runs.

Robinson captained Leicestershire towards the latter part of the 2006 season after Jeremy Snape dropped himself because of a lack of form. Robinson impressed in the field and helped guide Leicestershire to a 4th-place finish. Midway through the 2007 season Robinson himself lost his place due to a lack of form, and the captaincy of the side to Paul Nixon. It is thought unlikely that his contract will be renewed.

Robinson's highest score is 200 against the touring New Zealand side in 1999 while still with Essex.
He now plays for Wickford Cricket Club.

External links
Cricket Online Profile
Cricinfo Profile

English cricketers
Leicestershire cricketers
Essex cricketers
Norfolk cricketers
1973 births
Living people
People from Braintree, Essex
Sportspeople from Essex
Suffolk cricketers